is a Japanese manga series written and illustrated by Tenya Yabuno. It is based on the Level-5 video game series of the same title. The manga has been published by Shogakukan in CoroCoro Comic.

An anime television series based on the game aired on the TV Tokyo network from May 4, 2011. The series was produced by Level-5 in conjunction with TV Tokyo, Dentsu, and OLM.

After Tenma returns from Okinawa from tutoring the local children about soccer, he returns to Raimon, only to discover that the soccer club has never existed. Alpha, a person who comes from El Dorado, an organization from the future hell-bent on destroying soccer, tries to erase Tenma's soccer memories. With the assistance of Fei Rune and Clark Wonderbot, both came from the future, Tenma and his friends must defeat El Dorado in order to return soccer to the world.

Summary
The story begins with following Raimon's success on the Holy Road soccer tournament. Tenma returns to Raimon Junior High, but finds out that things have changed. The Raimon members are not soccer players anymore. In fact, there is no soccer club at the school. Shinsuke is in a different club from Tenma. Is this a parallel world? Tenma wonders.
That's when Alpha appears before him. Alpha want to erase Tenma passion for football.

Characters
is the main protagonist of the Inazuma Eleven GO series. He is a midfielder and he later became the captain for Raimon when Shindou Takuto got hospitalized. In the Chrono Stone series, he became a midfielder and captain for Tenmas, Raimon, Entaku no Kishi, El Dorado Team 03, Chrono Storm and Shinsei Inazuma Japan (alternate timeline).In the Galaxy series, he was chosen to be a midfielder and captain for Japan's team, Inazuma Japan. After the truth was revealed behind the FFIV2, he became a midfielder and captain for Earth Eleven.

is one of the main protagonists of the Inazuma Eleven GO series. He is a forward for Raimon, Raimon (Chrono Stone), El Dora Do Team 01, Chrono Storm and later in Galaxy, a forward for Inazuma Japan and Earth Eleven.

is a main protagonist of the Inazuma Eleven GO series. He was a forward, in the past, and midfielder and also the captain for Raimon. After he got hospitalized, he decided that Matsukaze Tenma should become captain for Raimon.In the Chrono Stone series, he became a defensive midfielder for Raimon, Entaku no Kishi, El Dorado Team 02, also being captain for the team, and for Chrono Storm.

is a character of the Chrono Stone Series. She is a Defender for Raimon, Entaku no Kishi, El Do Rado Team 01 and Chrono Storm.

Theme songs
Opening songs (Season 2/Chrono Stone)
 Jounetsu de Mune ATSU! (eps 1,3,5,7,9,11,13,15 & 17) by T-Pistonz+KMC
 Kandou Kyouyuu! (eps 2,4,6,8,10,12,14,16 & 18) by T-Pistonz+KMC
 Shoshin wo KEEP ON (eps 19-35) by T-Pistonz+KMC
 Raimei! Blue Train! (eps 36-) by T-Pistonz+KMC

Ending songs (Season 2/Chrono Stone)
 Natsu ga Yattekuru (eps 1-18) by Sorano Aoi (CV:Kitahara Sayaka)
 Te wo Tsunagou (eps 19-35) by Matsukaze Tenma (CV:Terasaki Yuka), Tsurugi Kyousuke (CV: Takashi Oohara) & Sorano Aoi (CV:Kitahara Sayaka)
 Bokutachi no Shiro (eps 36-39,41,43-46,48-50) by Matsukaze Tenma (CV:Terasaki Yuka), Tsurugi Kyousuke(CV: Takashi Oohara), Kirino Ranmaru (CV: Kobayashi Yuu), Shindou Takuto (CV: Mitsuki Saiga)& Nishizono Shinsuke (CV: Tomatsu Haruka)
 Seishun Oden (eps 40,42,47,51) Sorano Aoi (CV: Kitahara Sayaka), Yamana Akane (CV:Yurin), Seto Midori(CV: Mina), Nanobana Kinako(CV:Yuuki Aoi)

Episode list

References

Inazuma Eleven (anime)
Inazuma Eleven episode lists
2012 anime television series debuts
Japanese children's animated sports television series
OLM, Inc.
TV Tokyo original programming